The 2022 Categoría Primera B season (officially known as the 2022 Torneo BetPlay Dimayor season for sponsorship reasons) was the 33rd season of the Categoría Primera B since its founding as Colombia's second division football league. The season began on 22 January and ended on 29 November 2022.

Boyacá Chicó were the champions, winning their third Primera B title as well as promotion to the top flight by defeating Atlético Huila by a 3–0 score on aggregate in the season's Grand Final. Atlético Huila claimed the other promotion berth, defeating Deportes Quindío in the promotion play-off by a 2–1 aggregate score.

Format
The format for the 2022 Primera B season was approved at DIMAYOR's General Assembly session of 17 December 2021.

For this season, and similar to the previous one, two tournaments (Torneo I and Torneo II) with three stages each were played. In the first stage of both tournaments, the 15 teams (16 teams in Torneo II) played a single round-robin tournament with each team having a bye round and home-and-away order reversed for the Torneo II. The top eight teams at the end of the fifteen rounds advanced to the semi-finals, where teams were drawn into two groups of four where they played each one of their rivals twice. The top team of each group advanced to the finals, playing a double-legged series with the winners advancing to the Grand Final.

The Grand Final to decide the season champions as well as the first promotion to Primera A, was a double-legged series contested at the end of the season by the winners of the season's two tournaments. The second promotion spot to Primera A for the 2023 season was decided in a promotion play-off between the Grand Final loser and the best-placed team of the season's aggregate table, other than the Grand Final winners.

Teams
Originally, 15 teams took part in the season. Cortuluá and Unión Magdalena, who won the semifinal groups of the 2021–II Primera B tournament, were promoted to Primera A for the 2022 season and were replaced in Primera B by Atlético Huila and Deportes Quindío, who were relegated at the end of the 2021 Primera A Finalización tournament.

On 20 April 2022 the General Assembly of DIMAYOR approved the reaffiliation of Cúcuta Deportivo, which had been expelled from the entity on 25 November 2020 due to legal issues. Despite being in the top tier at the moment of its disaffiliation, it was decided that Cúcuta Deportivo would enter the Primera B competition starting from the second half of the 2022 season, with which the tournament expanded to 16 teams.

The following team joined the competition for the Torneo II:

Torneo I

First stage

Standings

Results

Semi-finals
The eight teams that advanced to the semi-finals were drawn into two groups of four teams, with the top two teams from the first stage being seeded in each group. The two group winners advanced to the finals.

Group A

Group B

Finals

Tied 2–2 on aggregate, Boyacá Chicó won on penalties.

Top scorers

Source: Soccerway

Torneo II

First stage

Standings

Results

Semi-finals
The eight teams that advanced to the semi-finals were drawn into two groups of four teams, with the top two teams from the first stage being seeded in each group. The two group winners advanced to the finals.

Group A

Group B

Finals

Tied 1–1 on aggregate, Atlético Huila won on penalties.

Top scorers

Source: Soccerway

Grand Final
The Torneo I and Torneo II winners played a double-legged series to decide the season champions and the first team promoted to the 2023 Categoría Primera A season.

Boyacá Chicó won 3–0 on aggregate.

Aggregate table

Promotion play-off
The best-placed team in the aggregate table, Deportes Quindío, played a double-legged series against the Grand Final losing side Atlético Huila to decide the second and last team promoted to Primera A.

Atlético Huila won 2–1 on aggregate and were promoted to Categoría Primera A.

See also
 2022 Categoría Primera A season
 2022 Copa Colombia

References

External links 
  

Categoría Primera B seasons
2
Colombia